Rhoda M. Dorsey (September 9, 1927 – May 10, 2014) was an American historian and college president. Dorsey was the longest serving president of Goucher College and the first woman to hold the position.

Early life and education
Rhoda Dorsey was born on September 9, 1927 in Dorchester neighborhood of Boston, Massachusetts. When Dorsey was a teenager, her mother died. She and her younger sister Frances Cobb (née Dorsey) were then cared for by Clara MacKenzie, whom her father retained full time, to care for the girls in his home in Newton, Massachusetts.

Dorsey graduated with a bachelor's degree Smith College, magna cum laude, in 1949. She then attended University of Cambridge as a Fulbright scholar where she earned a bachelor's and master's degree. In 1954, while completing her doctorate at University of Minnesota, she was hired as an assistant professor of history at Goucher College. Dorsey completed her doctorate in 1956. Her dissertation was titled The Resumption of Anglo-American Trade in New England 1783–1794.

Career 
Dorsey became an academic dean in 1968. In 1973, Dorsey succeeded Marvin Banks Perry, Jr. as the acting president. The next year, she was appointed as Goucher College's eighth president, becoming the institution's first woman to serve in this position. She presided over Goucher College in 1986 when its board of trustees voted to allow men to attend the college.

She retired on June 30, 1994, after serving as the President of Goucher for 21 years.

Community involvement 
Dorsey was a member of many corporate boards. Upon retirement, she remained a volunteer at the Hampton National Historic Site. She helped organize the 1995 book sale at her alma mater Smith College.

Personal life 
While serving as president of Goucher, Dorsey lived on campus in the president's residence and shared the residence with her childhood caretaker, Clara MacKenzie until Dorsey's retirement. Dorsey enjoyed traveling and was an avid gardener, specializing in flowers and herbs.

See also 

 List of women presidents or chancellors of co-ed colleges and universities

References

External links 
Goucher College profile

1927 births
2014 deaths
People from Boston
Smith College alumni
Alumni of the University of Cambridge
University of Minnesota alumni
Presidents of Goucher College
American women philanthropists
Goucher College faculty and staff
Women heads of universities and colleges
20th-century American philanthropists
People from Dorchester, Massachusetts
20th-century women philanthropists